Jonsson is a surname of Nordic, mostly Swedish, origin, meaning son of Jon. In Iceland the name is a part of the Patronymic name system. Notable people with the surname include:

Åke Jonsson, Swedish motocross racer
Andreas Jonsson (born 1980), 
Busk Margit Jonsson (born 1929), Soprano opera singer
Carl Jonsson (1885-1966), Swedish tug of war competitor
Daniel Jonsson (1599–1663), soldier and commander of Mora kompani of the Swedish Empire
Dennis Jonsson (born 1983), Swedish footballer
Eric Jonsson (1903–1974), Swedish chess player
Folke Jonsson, Swedish opera singer
Fredrik Jonsson (born 1973), Swedish tennis player
Gustaf Adolf Jonsson (1879-1949), Swedish sport shooter
Gustaf Jonsson (1903-1990), Swedish cross country skier
Hans Jonsson (born 1973), Swedish ice hockey player
Helena Jonsson (born 1984), Swedish biathlete
Helene Jonsson (born 1971), Swedish curler
Henry Jonsson (1912-2001), Swedish long distance runner
J. Erik Jonsson (1901-1995), American businessman and politician
Jan Jonsson (born 1948), Swedish handball player
Jan Jonsson (born 1952), Swedish Air Force officer
Jonas Jonsson (1873-1926), Swedish sailor
Jonas Jonsson (1903-1996), Swedish shooter
Lars Jonsson (born 1952), ornithological illustrator
Lars Jonsson (born 1982), Swedish ice hockey player
Lars Jonsson (born 1970), Swedish tennis player from Sweden
Lars Theodor Jonsson (1903-1998), Swedish cross country skier
Markus Jonsson (born 1981), Swedish footballer
Mats Jonsson (born 1973), Swedish cartoonist
Mats Jonsson (born 1957), Swedish rally driver
Mattias Jonsson (born 1974), Swedish politician
Mikael Jonsson (born 1966), Swedish chef
Niklas Jonsson (born 1969), Swedish cross country skier
Oscar Jonsson (disambiguation)
Owe Jonsson (1940-1962), Swedish sprinter
Per Jonsson (born 1966), Swedish speedway rider
Peter Jonsson, several people
Robin Jonsson (born 1983), Swedish ice hockey player
Sven-Olof Jonsson (1893-1945), Swedish gymnast
Thomas Denver Jonsson (born 1979), Swedish musician
Tomas Jonsson (born 1960), Swedish ice hockey player
Tor Jonsson (1916-1951), Norwegian author and journalist
Ulrika Jonsson (born 1967), Swedish-born British television presenter

See also
Jönsson
Jónsson

Swedish-language surnames
Patronymic surnames
Surnames from given names